Spying on the United Nations refers to acts of espionage committed by states against the United Nations.

The UN claims that acts of espionage on it are illegal under a number of international treaties, including the 1946 Convention on the Privileges and Immunities of the United Nations, the 1947 agreement between the United Nations and the United States, and the 1961 Vienna Convention on Diplomatic Relations.

In one notable incident, the US and other Western countries were found to be spying on the UN in March 2003, in the run-up to the Iraq War, and actual bugging devices were found inside the UN. In 2010, WikiLeaks revealed that US diplomats had been spying on UN leaders. On 25 August 2013, Der Spiegel revealed US National Security Agency secretly monitored the U.N.'s internal video conferencing system by decrypting during 2012.

Spying by individual states

United States

The British newspaper The Observer published an investigative report revealing that the National Security Agency (NSA) of the United States was conducting a secret surveillance operation directed at intercepting the telephone and email communications of several U.N. Security Council diplomats, both in their offices and in their homes. This campaign, the result of a directive by National Security Advisor Condoleezza Rice, was aimed primarily at the delegations from Angola, Cameroon, Chile, Mexico, Guinea and Pakistan. The investigative report cited an NSA memo which advised senior agency officials that it was "'mounting a surge' aimed at gleaning information not only on how delegations on the Security Council would vote on any second resolution on Iraq, but also 'policies', 'negotiating positions', 'alliances' and 'dependencies' – the 'whole gamut of information that could give US policymakers an edge in obtaining results favourable to US goals or to head off surprises'.

The authenticity of this memo has been called into question by many in the US and it is still unclear as to whether or not it is legitimate. 

A young translator for Britain's Government Communications Headquarters (GCHQ), Katharine Gun, leaked the memo to the Observer because she believed the war was illegal.  She was fired from her job at GCHQ. Gun was arrested and accused of violating the Official Secrets Act 1989, but charges were dropped after the prosecution presented no evidence.

In a 2009 confidential cable released by WikiLeaks the following year, US diplomats were directed to spy on UN leaders, including Secretary-General Ban Ki-moon, as well as the Security Council delegations of Russia, China, France, and the United Kingdom. According to documents leaked by Edward Snowden the NSA successfully cracked the encryption guarding the United Nations' internal videoconferencing system in the summer of 2012.

United Kingdom

Clare Short, a British cabinet minister who resigned in May 2003 over the war, stated in media interviews that British intelligence regularly spied on UN officials. She stated that she had read transcripts of Kofi Annan's conversations.

On 26 February 2004 Short alleged on the BBC Today radio programme that British spies regularly intercept UN communications, including those of Kofi Annan, its Secretary-General. The revelation came the day after the unexplained dropping of whistleblowing charges against former GCHQ translator Katharine Gun. Reacting to Short's statement, Tony Blair said "I really do regard what Clare Short has said this morning as totally irresponsible, and entirely consistent [with Short's character]." Blair also claimed that Short had put UK security, particularly the security of its spies, at risk. The same day, on the BBC's Newsnight programme, Short called Blair's response "pompous" and said that Britain had no need to spy on Kofi Annan. Blair did not explicitly deny the claims but Robin Cook, former Foreign Secretary, wrote that in his experience he would be surprised if the claims were true.

A few days later (on 29 February 2004) Ms Short appeared on ITV's Jonathan Dimbleby programme. She revealed that she had been written to by Britain's senior civil servant, Cabinet Secretary Andrew Turnbull. Turnbull's confidential letter (which Short showed to Dimbleby, and which was quoted on the programme) formally admonished her for discussing intelligence matters in the media, and threatened "further action" if she did not desist from giving interviews on the issue. Turnbull wrote that she had made claims "which damage the interests of the United Kingdom", and that he was "extremely disappointed". The "further action" referred to in the letter has been interpreted as threatening either the removal of Short's status as a Privy Counsellor or to legal action under the Official Secrets Act. Either course of action would be without recent precedent; the last time a Privy Counsellor's status was revoked was in 1921 when Sir Edgar Speyer was accused of collaborating with the Germans during the First World War. However, on 1 March 2004, Tony Blair's official spokesman refused to rule out such a step.

However, in the same interview on the Jonathan Dimbleby programme, Short backtracked on her claim about British agents bugging Mr Annan. She admitted that the transcripts she saw of Mr Annan's private conversations might have related to Africa and not to Iraq.
Asked whether she could confirm that the transcripts related to Iraq, she said: "I can't, but there might well have been ... I cannot remember a specific transcript in relation, it doesn't mean it wasn't there." Short also admitted that her original claim, on the Today programme, that Britain had eavesdropped on Mr Annan may have been inaccurate. Asked whether the material could have passed to the British by the Americans, she said: "It could. But it normally indicates that. But I can't remember that."

Australia
Australia reportedly received transcripts from the US and British phone-tapping operations against UN Secretary-General Kofi Annan and another top UN figure, Hans Blix via phone-tapping. Australia also allegedly assisted the bugging with spy satellites connected to the Pine Gap relay centre near Alice Springs.

Israel
British writer Gordon Thomas alleges that Mossad, Israel's foreign intelligence service, sees penetrating all UN diplomatic missions as a task of its New York katsa.

Cyprus
Cypriot intelligence is alleged to have stolen 6,500 UN documents containing sensitive information on its negotiations with Turkish Cypriot leaders. An internal UN investigation reportedly concluded that the theft was the work of the Cyprus Intelligence Service (CIS). The operation was reportedly headed by a CIS agent who befriended Sonja Bachmann, a senior aide to Alexander Downer, an Australian politician who served as an adviser to UN Secretary-General Ban Ki-moon and the special rapporteur on the Cyprus negotiations. The agent allegedly obtained Bachmann's email login information, allowing a CIS team to access Downer's email several times while he was away on UN business.

Subsequently, stolen documents were leaked to the press, and the UN investigation concluded that the Cypriots leaked the documents in the hope of undermining the role of Downer, who was seen as being too closely aligned to Turkish Cypriots.

Morocco
In a 28-page report to the UN Security Council on the situation in Western Sahara and on the situation faced by MINURSO, the UN monitoring force in the region, Secretary-General Ban Ki-moon wrote that Moroccan intelligence was intercepting MINURSO communications.

See also
United Nations Security Council and the Iraq War
F. Mark Wyatt

References

External links
 Spying on the UN

UN
UN
UN
Espionage scandals and incidents
2003 in Australia
2003 in the United Kingdom
2003 in the United States
United Nations relations
United States and the United Nations